Lee Ji-hyun (also Lee Ji-hyeon, ; born June 27, 1978) is a South Korean former swimmer, who specialized in backstroke events. She won the bronze medal in the medley relay at the 1994 Asian Games, and later represented South Korea at the 1996 Summer Olympics.

Lee started her competitive swimming, as a 16-year-old teen, at the 1994 Asian Games in Hiroshima, Japan. She helped the South Koreans earn a bronze medal in the 4 × 100 m medley relay with a time of 4:22.11.

At the 1996 Summer Olympics, Lee competed for her maiden South Korean squad in two swimming events. In the women's 100 m backstroke, Lee broke a new South Korean record to touch the wall first in 1:03.96, narrowly missing out of the consolation final by seven hundredths of a second (0.07). On the last day of the prelims, Lee posted a lead-off split of 1:04.55 to deliver the South Korean female foursome of Byun Hye-young (breaststroke), Park Woo-hee (butterfly), and Lee Bo-eun (freestyle) a combined time of 4:18.98 for the eighteenth spot in the 4 × 100 m medley relay.

She was educated at Mangmi Girls' Middle School, Busan Sport High School, and Sungshin Women's University.

References

External links
 

1978 births
Living people
South Korean female backstroke swimmers
Olympic swimmers of South Korea
Swimmers at the 1996 Summer Olympics
Asian Games medalists in swimming
Sportspeople from Busan
Asian Games bronze medalists for South Korea
Medalists at the 1994 Asian Games
Swimmers at the 1994 Asian Games
20th-century South Korean women